Reddish South railway station is a stop on the Stockport–Stalybridge Line in Reddish, Stockport, England. The station, used by only 26 passengers in 2013/14, is one of the quietest on the UK rail network. From May 1992 until May 2018, it was served by parliamentary services in order to avoid formal proceeding to close the line. Despite the low passenger numbers, the line itself is used regularly for freight traffic and empty stock transfers.

History
It was taken over by the London and North Western Railway (LNWR), following a merger of the two companies in 1846. The 19th-century civil engineering firm John Brogden and Sons was the contractor.

The station, which consisted of two island platforms, also had a signal box, goods sidings and engine shed. All regular Monday to Saturday hourly services would stop at the station. However, express traffic was drastically reduced when services were redirected to Manchester London Road station (now ) in May 1899.

With the redirection of the long-distance express services, the station became a scheduled stop for local traffic. Although the Stockport–Stalybridge Line escaped the 1960s Beeching cuts, when large numbers of cross-country branch lines were closed for being uneconomical, the station and line were gradually run down by British Rail over the next couple of decades. The remaining original station building on one of the island platforms was demolished, with the sidings and engine shed removed. After the line was eventually reduced to a single track, the second island platform was abandoned. One of the track beds was sold off and the other was filled in. The station became a request stop.

For many years, the only service was the 09:22 Fridays-only parliamentary train from Stockport to Stalybridge.

In September 2006, open-access operator Grand Central proposed to run services from  via  and the West Coast Main Line to London Euston. This service would have travelled via Stalybridge, Guide Bridge and Reddish South to Stockport.  However, the proposal was dropped after Virgin Trains cited its protection clause preventing any other operators from using the West Coast Main Line.

In May 2007, Network Rail proposed in its North West Route Utilisation Strategy that both Reddish South and Denton stations should be closed while the line remain open for freight and diverted passenger workings.

On 20 May 2018, Northern replaced the Friday service with one return service on Saturday mornings.  The train stops here at 9:00 towards Stockport and 9:50 returning to Stalybridge.

Quietest station in the UK

Between April 2013 and March 2014, Reddish South was the third-least-used station in Great Britain, after Teesside Airport railway station and Shippea Hill railway station, with only 26 recorded  passengers. In 2015, passenger figures from the Office for Rail and Road showed that Reddish South had become Britain's fourth-quietest railway station. As of 2018/19, Reddish South became the third least used station in the UK, with just 60 entries and exits. 
In January 2020, the station was named as the UK's third quietest with just 60 entries and exits between 1 April 2018 and 31 March 2019.

References

External links

 Friends of Reddish South Station
 Pictures of Reddish South and Denton stations on Flickr

Railway stations in the Metropolitan Borough of Stockport
DfT Category F2 stations
Former London and North Western Railway stations
Northern franchise railway stations
Low usage railway stations in the United Kingdom